Silurian Valley is a valley in the Mojave Desert, in San Bernardino County, California. The valley is drained by Salt Creek a tributary of the Amargosa River and contains Silurian Lake and Dry Sand Lake.

Silurian Valley is bounded on the northwest by the Salt Spring Hills; on the north by the Dumont Dunes and Dumont Hills; on the west by the Avawatz Mountains; on the northeast by the Kingston Range; on the east by the Valjean Valley and Silurian Hills and on the southeast and south by the Soda Mountains.

References

Valleys of San Bernardino County, California
Old Spanish Trail (trade route)